Isabelle Geffroy (born 1 May 1980), known professionally as Zaz, is a French singer and songwriter who mixes jazzy styles, French variety, soul and acoustic. She is known for her single "Je veux", taken from her self-titled debut album, released on 10 May 2010.  Worldwide Zaz has sold over 5 million albums, including 2 million outside France.

Early life
Zaz was born in Tours, France. Her mother was a Spanish teacher, and her father worked for an electric company. In 1985, she entered the Conservatoire de Tours with her sister and her brother, attending courses from the ages of 6 to 11. She studied music theory, specifically the violin, piano, guitar, and choral singing. In 1994, she moved to Bordeaux. In 1995, she took singing lessons and played sports for a year in Bordeaux. In 2000, she won a scholarship from the regional council, which allowed her to join a school of modern music, the CIAM (Centre for Musical Activities and Information) of Bordeaux. Her musical influences included 'Four Seasons' by Vivaldi, jazz singers such as Ella Fitzgerald, and other singers such as Enrico Macias, Bobby McFerrin, and Richard Bona, as well as African, Latin, and Cuban rhythms. In 2006, she moved to Paris.

Career

In 2001, she started her singing career in the blues band "Fifty Fingers". She sang in musical groups in Angoulême, especially in a jazz quintet. She became one of the four singers of Izar-Adatz (Basque for "Shooting Star"), a variety band which consisted of sixteen people with whom she toured for two years, especially in the Midi-Pyrenees and the Basque Country. She worked in the studio as a backing singer in Toulouse and performed with many singers, including Maeso, Art Mengo, Vladimir Max, Jean-Pierre Mader, and Serge Guerao.

In 2011, Zaz won an EBBA Award. Every year the European Border Breakers Awards (EBBA) recognize the success of ten emerging artists or groups who reached audiences outside their own countries with their first internationally released album in the past year.

In May 2010, French magazine Télérama announced: "Rumor has swelled in recent weeks: Zaz is an extraordinary voice, and she will be the revelation of the summer!". On 10 May 2010, Zaz released her first album. It contains songs she wrote ("Trop sensible") and co-composed ("Les passants", "Le long de la route", "Prends garde à ta langue", "J'aime à nouveau", "Ni oui ni non"). Kerredine Soltani produced the album on the label "Play On" and wrote and composed the hit single "Je veux". The pop singer Raphaël Haroche wrote her songs "Éblouie par la nuit", "Port Coton" and "La fée". In 2010, she signed a contract for her tours with Caramba and publisher Sony ATV. She was invited to make several television appearances (such as Taratata or Chabada) and was featured in several programs on the radio. On Sunday 6 October 2013, Zaz appeared on BBC One's The Andrew Marr Show in London and sang "Je veux" live.

Zaz then toured France (Paris, La Rochelle, Montauban, Saint-Ouen, Chateauroux, Landerneau, Fécamp...), performed at the Francofolies of Montreal (Canada), and sang in Monthey (Switzerland), Brussels, Berlin, and Milan. In autumn Zaz topped the charts in Belgium, Switzerland, and Austria. Matthieu Baligand, her manager and producer at Caramba Entertainment, explained to Libération: "There's a lot about her right now and people want to see her tour... But despite the demand, it seems preferable for her to begin touring in fifty small places, which will make her more credible. Zaz is a popular, intuitive artist, who is familiar with music, who can sing, but doing a quality show is something else (...)." In November 2010, the debut album Zaz became double platinum and she was awarded "Revelation Song" by the Académie Charles Cros. Zaz also won the European Border Breakers Award: she was named the French artist most played abroad in 2010. According to a survey published by L'Internaute, Zaz was the most popular French singer in the 2010 ranking.

She is also featured on the song "Cœur Volant" for the soundtrack of the 2011 film, Hugo. Her live CD and DVD Zaz live tour Sans Tsu Tsou was revealed.

Her song "Eblouie Par La Nuit" was featured in the 2013 American neo-noir crime thriller, "Dead Man Down".

In 2012, Zaz went on tour and held concerts in various countries around the world including Japan, Canada, Germany, Poland, Switzerland, Slovenia, Czech Republic (Colours of Ostrava), Croatia, Bulgaria, Serbia, and Turkey, among other countries.

With her album Paris she won the 2015 Echo award for best international female rock/pop artist.

In 2016, Zaz was invited to perform in Zacatecas City, Mexico as part of the Festival Cultural Zacatecas.

In September 2018, Zaz released "Qué vendrá", the first track from an upcoming album titled Effet miroir ("Mirror Effect"). The track's title and chorus are in Spanish.

In 2019 Zaz took a career break in order to, "look after myself...There has to be a balance because it's Isa [a contraction of her real name] who feeds Zaz, not Zaz who feeds Isa."  In October 2021 Zaz released her fifth studio album, Isa.

Philanthropy
In 2011, she joined the Les Enfoirés charity ensemble. 
	
Zaz created the project Zazimut to "develop and promote projects for a society more respectful of life in all its forms".

Awards and nominations
{| class=wikitable
|-
! Year !! Awards !! Work !! Category !! Result !! Ref.
|-
| rowspan=8|2014
| rowspan=7|World Music Awards
| rowspan=2|Herself
| World's Best Female Artist 
| 
|-
| World's Best Live Act 
| 
|-
| Zaz
| rowspan=2|World's Best Album
| 
|-
| Recto Verso
| 
|-
| "Si"
| rowspan=2|World's Best Song
| 
|-
| rowspan=2|"On Ira"
| 
|-
| World's Best Video 
| 
|-
| rowspan=2|Žebřík Music Awards
| Paris
| Best International Album
| 
| rowspan=2|
|-
| 2015
| Herself
| Best International Live
|

Discography

Studio albums

Box sets

Live albums

Singles

As lead artist

As featured artist

| "Le jardin des larmes"
| 2021

Charity singles
 2014: "Le chemin de pierre (version pop)" (with Nolwenn Leroy, Thomas Dutronc...)

Other charted songs

Notes

References

External links

Zaz on imusic.am
Zaz Istanbul Concert 2011

1980 births
21st-century French singers
Zaz
French singer-songwriters
Living people
Musicians from Tours, France
21st-century French women singers